= 2025 Kho Kho World Cup final =

The 2025 Kho Kho World Cup finals were contested between India and Nepal in both the men's and women's editions. Both finals were won by India, which went undefeated throughout the tournament. This was the first time that a Nepali team had participated in a World Cup final in any sport.

== Men's edition ==
India was on offense first, and beat Nepal 54–36. This repeated the result of the opening match of the tournament.

=== 1st turn ===
End-of-turn score: 26–0

The Indian attackers scored mainly through sky dives, with 10 points coming in the first 4 minutes of the turn.

=== 2nd turn ===
End-of-turn score: 26–18 (+0 vs +18)

Janak Chand and Suraj Pujara were the highest-scoring Nepali attackers.

=== 3rd turn ===
End-of-turn score: 54–18 (+28 vs +0)

=== 4th turn ===
End-of-turn score: 54–36 (+0 vs +18)

== Women's edition ==
India was on offense first, and beat Nepal 78–40.

=== 1st turn ===
End-of-turn score: 34–0

Seven of the first nine Nepali defenders were dismissed through running touches.

=== 2nd turn ===
End-of-turn score: 35–24 (+1 vs +24)

It took over a minute for the first Nepali tag to be made. The first batch of Indian defenders achieved a 1-point Dream Run, which ended with Chaithra B being dismissed shortly after the 3-minute mark.

=== 3rd turn ===
End-of-turn score: 73–24 (+38 vs + 0)

=== 4th turn ===
End-of-turn score: 78–40 (+5 vs +16)

Chaithra B helped India secure victory by achieving another Dream Run, this time scoring 5 points and lasting 5 minutes and 14 seconds.
